Ugo Napoleone Giuseppe Broggi (December 29, 1880, Como – November 23, 1965, Milan) was an Italian actuary, mathematician, philosopher, statistician, and mathematical economist.

Education and career
Broggi studied in Italy and Germany, graduating in actuarial science in 1902 and in economic science in 1904.

In 1906 Hoepli Editore published Broggi's book Matematica Attuariale, which was translated into French as Traité des Assurances de la Vie (Hermann, 1907) and into German as Versicherungsmathematik (Teubner, 1911).

In 1907 he obtained his doctorate, with advisor David Hilbert, from the University of Göttingen with a thesis entitled "Die Axiome der Wahrscheinlichkeitsrechnung" (The axioms of probability theory). Hilbert in his 1899 book Grundlagen der Geometrie (GdG) gave axioms for a modern treatment of Euclidean geometry. Influenced by GdG, Georg Bohlmann in 1901 gave axioms for probability theory. In 1904 at the University of Zürich, Rudolf Laemmel (1879–1962) published a doctoral dissertation Ermittlung von Wahrsheinlichkeiten, dealing with the axioms of probability. In 1905 Hilbert gave lectures on axiomatized probability theory based upon Bohlmann's work.

In 1907 Broggi received not only a doctorate in mathematics but also a doctorate in philosophy. Broggi's 1909 paper on relativity "accurately discussed contemporary ideas on matter, radiation and time."

In 1910 Broggi moved to Argentina to become a professor of financial mathematics. At the National University of La Plata (NULP) he was appointed in 1911 professor of mathematical analysis and in 1912 professor of higher mathematics. In June 1912 the University of Buenos Aires (UBA) appointed him full professor of statistics. In November 1913 UBA's (newly created) Faculty of Economic Sciences (FES) appointed him to the FES council for a term of six years. In 1922 the FES council appointed him professor of financial mathematics. For the academic year 1925–1926 Broggi was on academic leave in Europe. In 1927 he gave some mathematical lectures in Rosario. At the end of 1927 he decided to return to Europe. In March 1928 he resigned his professorial chairs.

In 1928 he was invited speaker at the International Congress of Mathematicians in Bologna.

Broggi was a book reviewer for Rivista di Scienza. For 20 years he was on the editorial board of the Giornale degli economisti e Annali di economia. He was also an editor for several other journals, including the Bollettino dell'associazione degli attuari italiani (Bulletin of the association of Italian actuaries) and the Rendiconti del Circolo Matematico di Palermo.

After the end of WW II, Broggi returned to Buenos Aires for a brief visit, during which his former students held a party in his honor.

Selected publications
 Matematica attuariale - Teoria statistica della mortalità. Matematica delle assicurazioni sulla vita, Hoepli, Milano, 1906
 Die Axiome der Wahrscheinlichkeitsrechnung, Inaugural-Dissertation zur Erlangung der Doktorwürde der hohen philosophischen Fakultät der Georg-Augusts-Universität zu Göttingen vorgelegt von Ugo Broggi, Göttingen, Druck der Dieterichschen Universitäts-Buchdruckerei, 1907
 Sur le principe de la moyenne arithmetique, Paris, Gauthier Villars, 1909
 Versicherungsmathematik: deutsche Ausgab, Leipzig Druck und Verlag, 1911
 Analisis matematico: vol. I - Las nociones fundamentales, La Plata, 1919
 Analisis matematico: vol. II - Teorias generales, funciones de mas de una variable, La Plata, 1927

References

External links
 

1880 births
1965 deaths
20th-century Italian mathematicians
Italian actuaries
Italian statisticians
Mathematical economists
General equilibrium theorists
University of Göttingen alumni
Academic staff of the National University of La Plata
Academic staff of the University of Buenos Aires